Internetwork Packet Exchange (IPX) is the network layer protocol in the IPX/SPX protocol suite. IPX is derived from Xerox Network Systems' IDP. It also has the ability to act as a transport layer protocol.

The IPX/SPX protocol suite was very popular through the late 1980s and mid-1990s because it was used by Novell NetWare, a network operating system. Due to Novell NetWare's popularity, IPX became a prominent protocol for internetworking.

A big advantage of IPX was a small memory footprint of the IPX driver, which was vital for DOS and Windows up to Windows 95 due to the limited size at that time of conventional memory. Another IPX advantage is easy configuration of its client computers. However, IPX does not scale well for large networks such as the Internet. As such, IPX usage decreased as the boom of the Internet made TCP/IP nearly universal. 

Computers and networks can run multiple network protocols, so almost all IPX sites also run TCP/IP, to allow Internet connectivity. It is also possible to run later Novell products without IPX, with the beginning of full support for both IPX and TCP/IP by NetWare version 5 in late 1998.

Description 
A big advantage of IPX protocol is its little or no need for configuration.  In the time when protocols for dynamic host configuration did not exist and the BOOTP protocol for centralized assigning of addresses was not common, the IPX network could be configured almost automatically. A client computer uses the MAC address of its network card as the node address and learns what it needs to know about the network topology from the servers or routers – routes are propagated by Routing Information Protocol, services by Service Advertising Protocol.

A small IPX network administrator had to care only
 to assign all servers in the same network the same network number,
 to assign different network numbers to different frame formats in the same network,
 to assign different network numbers to different interfaces of servers with multiple network cards (Novell NetWare server with multiple network cards worked automatically as a router),
 to assign different network numbers to servers in different interconnected networks,
 to start router process on nodes with multiple network cards in more complex networks.

IPX packet structure

Each IPX packet begins with a header with the following structure:

The Packet Type values are:

IPX addressing

An IPX address has the following structure:

Network number

The network number allows to address (and communicate with) the IPX nodes which do not belong to the same network or cabling system. The cabling system is a network in which a data link layer protocol can be used for communication. To allow communication between different networks, they must be connected with IPX routers. A set of interconnected networks is called an internetwork. Any Novell NetWare server may serve as an IPX router. Novell also supplied stand-alone routers. Multiprotocol routers of other vendors often support IPX routing. Using different frame formats in one cabling system is possible, but it works similarly as if separate cabling systems were used (i.e. different network numbers must be used for different frame formats even in the same cabling system and a router must be used to allow communication between nodes using different frame formats in the same cabling system).

 Logical networks are assigned a unique 32-bit address in the range 0x1 to 0xFFFFFFFE (hexadecimal).
 Hosts have a 48-bit node address, which is by default set to the 6 bytes of the network interface card MAC address. Network addresses, which exist in addition to the node address, but are not part of the MAC layer, are assigned only if an IPX router is present or by manual configuration in the network. The network address covers every network participant that can talk to another participant without the aid of an IPX router. In combination, both network and node address form a 80 bit unique identifier for each IPX node across connected logical networks. The node number itself is unique to the logical network only.
 Network number 00:00:00:00 refers to the current network, and is also used during router discovery. It's also the default in case no router is present, but can be changed by manual configuration, depending on the IPX implementation.
 Broadcast network number is FF:FF:FF:FF.

Node number

The node number is used to address an individual computer (or more exactly, a network interface) in the network. Client stations use its network interface card MAC address as the node number.

The value FF:FF:FF:FF:FF:FF may be used as a node number in a destination address to broadcast a packet to "all nodes in the current network".

Socket number

The socket number serves to select a process or application in the destination node.
The presence of a socket number in the IPX address allows the IPX to act as a transport layer protocol, comparable with the User Datagram Protocol (UDP) in the Internet protocol suite.

Comparison with IP
The IPX network number is conceptually identical to the network part of the IP address (the parts with netmask bits set to 1); the node number has the same meaning as the bits of IP address with netmask bits set to 0. The difference is that the boundary between network and node part of address in IP is variable, while in IPX it is fixed. As the node address is usually identical to the MAC address of the network adapter, the Address Resolution Protocol is not needed in IPX.

For routing, the entries in the IPX routing table are similar to IP routing tables; routing is done by network address, and for each network address a network:node of the next router is specified in a similar fashion an IP address/netmask is specified in IP routing tables.

There are three routing protocols available for IPX networks. In early IPX networks, a version of Routing Information Protocol (RIP) was the only available protocol to exchange routing information. Unlike RIP for IP, it uses delay time as the main metric, retaining the hop count as a secondary metric. Since NetWare 3, the NetWare Link Services Protocol (NLSP) based on IS-IS is available, which is more suitable for larger networks. Cisco routers implement an IPX version of EIGRP protocol as well.

Frame formats
IPX can be transmitted over Ethernet using one of the following 4 frame formats or encapsulation types:

 802.3 (raw) encapsulation comprises an IEEE 802.3 frame header (destination MAC, source MAC, length) immediately followed by IPX data. It is used in legacy systems, and can be distinguished by the first two bytes of the IPX header always containing a value of 0xFFFF, which cannot be interpreted as valid LLC Destination and Source Service Access Points in this location of the frame.
 802.2 (LLC or Novell) comprises an IEEE 802.3 frame header (destination MAC, source MAC, length) followed by an LLC header (DSAP 0xE0, SSAP 0xE0, control 0x03) followed by IPX data. The 0xE0 fields of the LLC header indicate "NetWare".
 802.2 (SNAP) comprises an IEEE 802.3 frame header, an LLC header (DSAP 0xAA, SSAP 0xAA, control 0x03), a SNAP header (OUI 0x000000, type 0x8137), and IPX data. The 0xAA fields of the LLC header indicate "SNAP", and the OUI 0x000000 in the SNAP header indicates an encapsulated EtherType.
 Ethernet II encapsulation comprises an Ethernet II frame header (destination MAC, source MAC, EtherType 0x8137) followed by IPX data.

In non-Ethernet networks only 802.2 and SNAP frame types are available.

References

External links
 RFC 1132 - A Standard for the Transmission of 802.2 Packets over IPX Networks
 Ethernet Frame Types: Don Provan's Definitive Answer

Novell NetWare
Network layer protocols